Channel 5 may refer to:

Americas
 Canal 5 (Mexico), a Mexican television network owned by Televisa
 XHGC-TDT, a television station in Mexico City, flagship of the Canal 5 network
 Canal 5 Noticias, a news channel in Buenos Aires, Argentina
 Canal 5 (Uruguay), a government-owned Uruguayan television network
 Tonis (Canada), a former Ukrainian-language digital cable specialty television channel
 Telefe Rosario, Argentine television station which broadcasts from the city of Rosario
 Great Belize Television, Belize television station, known as "Channel 5", founded in 1991 and broadcasting from Belize City
 Panamericana Televisión a Peruvian free-to-air television channel Broadcasting on Channel 5 in Lima, Peru
 Paravisión, a Paraguayan television network broadcasting on Channel 5 in Asunción
 TV+ (Chile), formerly UCV Televisión, a chilean free-to-air television channel broadcasting on Channel 5 in Santiago de Chile
 WNYW-TV Channel 5, a Fox-affiliated television station in New York City, United States
 Channel 5 (web channel), an American web channel led by Andrew Callaghan

Asia
 TV5 (Philippine TV network), a Filipino commercial television network formerly known as "ABC 5" and "5"
 DWET-TV, the flagship television station of TV5 in Metro Manila, Philippines
 IRIB TV5, operated by Islamic Republic of Iran Broadcasting
 Channel 5 (Pakistani TV channel), Pakistani Entertainment and News Channel
 Channel 5 (Thai TV channel) Thailand television broadcaster, founded in 1958 and owned by the Royal Thai Army
 Channel 5 (Singaporean TV channel), English-language Singapore television broadcaster
 Sport 5, Israeli cable and satellite TV station
Canal 5 Creative Campus, a tourist attraction in Changzhou, China

Europe
 5 Kanal, Ukrainian television channel
 Canale 5, Italian television broadcaster
 Channel 5 (British TV channel), British commercial public broadcast network
 Channel 5 Broadcasting Limited, Parent company of Channel 5 (British TV channel)
 Channel 5 Lithuania, the largest regional TV channel in Lithuania
 France 5, French public television network
 Kanal 5 (Sweden), Swedish commercial channel
 Kanal 5 (Denmark), Danish television channel
 Petersburg – Channel 5, Russian broadcaster, seen nationally, with regional channels
 Telecinco, Spain's second private television station

Other uses
 Channel 5 (Fear the Walking Dead), an episode of the television series Fear the Walking Dead

See also
 CH5 (disambiguation)
 C5 (disambiguation)
 Kanal 5 (disambiguation)
 TV5 (disambiguation)
 Chanel No. 5, French perfume produced by the Parisian fashion house of Chanel
 Channel 5 Video Distribution, a defunct home video brand created by Polygram, now owned by Universal Pictures
 Channel 5 branded TV stations in the United States
 Channel 5 virtual TV stations in Canada
 Channel 5 virtual TV stations in Mexico
 Channel 5 virtual TV stations in the United States

 Channel 5 TV stations in Canada
 Channel 5 TV stations in Mexico
 Channel 5 digital TV stations in the United States
 Channel 5 low-power TV stations in the United States

05